Príncipe de Vergara is a station on Line 2 and Line 9 of the Madrid Metro. It takes its name from Baldomero Espartero, Prince of Vergara.

References 

Line 2 (Madrid Metro) stations
Line 9 (Madrid Metro) stations
Railway stations in Spain opened in 1924